John Sidney Acosta (December 13, 1898 – July  18, 1929) was a college football player and coach from Jacksonville. He was a prominent guard for the Yale Bulldogs, selected first-team All-American in 1920 by Walter Eckersall. He then took up coaching. Acosta was the freshman coach for the Florida Gators in 1922, leading them to a southern title. He died in an automobile accident.

References

External links

Florida Gators football coaches
Yale Bulldogs football players
All-American college football players
American football guards
1898 births
Players of American football from Jacksonville, Florida
1929 deaths
Road incident deaths in Georgia (U.S. state)